The British Contact Lens Association is an educational and scientific membership organisation formed in 1977.

In 2013 it had 2000 members.  It organises an annual Clinical Conference and Exhibition.  In 2015 the main themes were myopia management and presbyopia correction.  It will be organising a research symposium in March 2016 with the Netherlands Contact Lens Congress.

The current BCLA President is Neil Retallic

A President is elected for either one or two years

Previous Presidents have included:

 Indie Grewal (Optometrist) 
 Jonathon Bench (Optometrist) 
 Sunil Shah (Ophthalmologist)
 Keith Tempany (Optician)
 Brian Tompkins (Optometrist)
 Andy Yorke
 Susan Bowers (Optometrist)

The Current CEO is Luke Stevens-Burt (Since April 2020)

Previous CEOs have included

Cheryl Donnell (until March 2020)

Vivian Freeman

References

External links
 Colored Eye Contacts
British Contact Lens Association

Eye care in the United Kingdom
Medical associations based in the United Kingdom
Organisations based in the City of London